Coastal Bikol is one of the three groups or family languages of Bikol languages. It includes Mt. Isarog Agta, Mt. Iraya Agta, Central Bikol, and Southern Catanduanes Bikol, sometimes classified as a dialect of Central Bikol.

Ethnologue
The languages grouped as Coastal Bikol according to Ethnologue are:
Coastal Bikol (Northern)
Isarog Agta language
Mount Iraya Agta language
Central Bikol language
Canaman dialect (standard)
Naga City dialect
Partido dialect
Tabaco-Legazpi-Sorsogon (TLS) dialect
Daet dialect
Southern Catanduanes Bikol language

See also
 Bikol languages

Notes

References

 

Bikol languages